Siretu may refer to several villages in Romania:

 Siretu, a village in Letea Veche Commune, Bacău County
 Siretu, a village in Săucești Commune, Bacău County
 Siretu, a village in the town of Mărășești, Vrancea County